Mehrobod (formerly: Proletarsk) is a town and jamoat in Tajikistan. It is the administrative capital of Jabbor Rasulov District in Sughd Region, located just south of the regional capital of Khujand and south-west of the cities of Buston and Ghafurov.

The population of Mehrobod in 2020 is estimated at 16,600.

See also
List of cities in Tajikistan

References

Populated places in Sughd Region
Jamoats of Tajikistan